Macarthur railway station is located on the Main South line, serving the Sydney suburb of Campbelltown. It is served by Sydney Trains T8 Airport & South and NSW TrainLink Southern Highlands Line services. It is the southern extremity of the electrified Sydney Trains network.

History
In 1976, a plan was created to build a new station 488m in the southern direction of the existing Campbelltown railway station. The plan for a "new" Campbelltown station was dropped and the plan was modified to be an unmanned, new, station. The plan was later changed to be 1800m to its current location, being built to serve a shopping centre being built 500m away. The station was originally supposed to be named Ambarvale, after the suburb it is located, but this was later changed to Macarthur, the name of the region. Construction started in November 1983 with the station opening on 28 July 1985. It was initially only served by a few peak-hour services until a new timetable was introduced on 16 November 1986.

The station initially consisted of two side platforms. Because suburban trains terminating on the main lines caused congestion to through trains, a side turnback platform was added in time for the 2000 Summer Olympics.

Under the CityRail Clearways Project, Macarthur received an upgrade. This work, completed in late 2010, included refurbishment of the station, a bus interchange, and a new carpark. In a proposed second stage, Macarthur was to receive a fourth platform for through trains heading south, however, the project was cancelled.

In January 2013, the Southern Sydney Freight Line opened to the west of the station.

Electrification through the Macarthur station site was completed in 1968 as part of the Liverpool-Glenlee electrification project. Electric passenger trains terminated at Campbelltown, but freight trains continued to Glenlee coal siding and loader (now in Mount Annan) so that electrically hauled coal trains could connect it and Port Kembla. The Glenlee coal loader has closed and electric trains are stopped at Macarthur, with the wires only extending a few hundred metres down the line.

Platforms and services

Transport links
Macarthur station is served by various bus routes with Busabout being the primary operator. The bus interchange is located on Menangle Road.

877: Campbelltown to Kearns via Eagle Vale & Eschol Park
879: Campbelltown to Leumeah via Blair Athol
880: Campbelltown to Minto via Eagle Vale & Kearns
886: Campbelltown to Glen Alpine
887: Campbelltown to Wollongong via Appin
888: Campbelltown to St Helens Park via Ambarvale & Rosemeadow
889: Campbelltown to Menangle via Menangle Park
890: Campbelltown to Harrington Park via Narellan Vale & Narellan
890C: Campbelltown to Camden via Narellan
891: Campbelltown to Mount Annan via Currans Hill
892: Campbelltown to Mount Annan via Narellan Vale
893: Campbelltown to Narellan via Elderslie & Spring Farm
895: Campbelltown to Camden South via Camden
896: Campbelltown to Oran Park via Gregory Hills

Macarthur Station is also served by one NightRide route:
NightRide route N30: Macarthur to Town Hall station

References

External links

Macarthur station details Transport for New South Wales

Easy Access railway stations in Sydney
Railway stations in Sydney
Railway stations in Australia opened in 1985
Main Southern railway line, New South Wales
City of Campbelltown (New South Wales)